Hanji (lit. "Scooping Up the Moonlight") is a 2011 South Korean drama film written and directed by Im Kwon-taek. It is Im's 101st film and was inspired by a true story.

Plot 

Pil-yong is a middling civil servant who is gripped by guilt every time he sees his wife Hyo-kyung, who is half-paralyzed from a stroke induced by his affair with another woman. But he finds newfound purpose in life when he is assigned to revive Jeonju's hanji industry. Hanji is Korean traditional paper made from mulberry trees; it is known in Asia for its beauty, flexibility and high quality, can reportedly last a thousand years, and is used for writing and creating 2D images similar to painting as well as 3D objects such as chamber pots and tea service. What begins as a desperate attempt to be promoted at work turns into a consuming passion as Pil-yong discovers the beauty of the craft, and he joins other devotees (such as documentary filmmaker Ji-won) to reenact traditional methods of hanji-making under the moonlight.

Cast
Park Joong-hoon as Pil-yong
Kang Soo-yeon as Ji-won
Ye Ji-won as Hyo-kyung
Ahn Byung-kyung as Deok-soon
Jang Hang-sun as Monk Doam
Jung Woo-hyuk as Section chief
Im Seung-dae as Subsection chief
Hwang Choon-ha as Clerk
Min Do-young as Assistant clerk
Jin Kyung as Female section chief
Han Soo-yeon as Jung Da-young
Kwon Hyun-sang as Yong-gi
Min Kyung-jin as Oh Kyung-min
Kim Gi-cheon as Kim Choon-byung
Kwon Tae-won as Boss Kwon
Bang Eun-mi as Hwang Kyung-ja
Kim Byung-choon as Chun Jang-in
Park Min-hee as Boss Min
Kim Dong-ho as Kim Joong-kwon (cameo)
Kim Young-bin as Pil-yong's older brother (cameo)

References

External links

2011 films
South Korean mystery drama films
Films directed by Im Kwon-taek
2010s South Korean films